Tatjana Festerling (née Schimanski, 6 March 1964, Wuppertal) is a German far-right politician who was a member of the organisation team of the political movement Pegida. She was expelled from the Pegida leadership for advocating that asylum-seekers should be shot if they attempt to cross the German border. Since then, she has been active patrolling the Bulgarian-Turkish border area together with a Dutch Pegida leader and local paramilitary forces.

Political activities

Festerling was a founding member of the Hamburg section of the  Alternative for Germany (AfD). She resigned from the party, after a looming threat of expulsion for her condoning action of the Hooligans against Salafists movement.

In 2015, Festerling joined Pegida and became the first-ever Pegida candidate to run for office. She contested for the mayoral election in the city of Dresden and gained 9.6% of the votes in the election held on 7 June 2015. Der Spiegel had described Pegida's decision in 2015 to invite Festerling, a woman, to work with the party founder Lutz Bachmann as  an adroit move.

Festerling demanded the "Säxit"the secession of Saxony from the Federal Republic of Germanyon October 12, 2015, after she had already demanded the rebuilding of the former Iron Curtain over Germany on March 9, 2015.

In June 2016, Festerling was dismissed from the Pegida leadership.  Bachmann stated that her behaviour 'was injurious to the organisation' as the reason for her dismissal.

In 2017 she was found guilty of Volksverhetzung in Dresden and sent to prison for 120 days.

Personal
Festerling trained in coaching and yoga and has two grown up children.

References

1964 births
Living people
Counter-jihad activists
Politicians from Wuppertal
Alternative for Germany politicians